Amblyseius caviphilus is a species of mite in the family Phytoseiidae.

References

caviphilus
Articles created by Qbugbot
Animals described in 1986
Taxa named by Wolfgang Karg